Kenwith Castle Halt was a minor railway station or halt/request stop in north Devon, close to Bideford, serving the nearby castle of that name. It lay 1 mile and 75 chains from Bideford Quay.

History 
This was to have been the site of the junction for a line running over ten miles to Clovelly.

Infrastructure
Kenwith Castle Halt had no platform or shelter and was sited at an ungated level crossing on the road to the castle; the gates had been removed in 1905. The line ran through a cutting at this point. No sidings or freight facilities were provided.

Micro history
In January 1901, the first train, with one carriage, ran from Bideford to Northam carrying a few friends of the Directors.

References 

Notes

Sources

 Baxter, Julia & Jonathan (1980). The Bideford, Westward Ho! and Appledore railway 1901-1917. Pub. Chard. .
 Christie, Peter (1995). North Devon History. The Lazarus Press. .
 Garner, Rod (2008). The Bideford, Westward Ho! & Appledore Railway. Pub. Kestrel Railway Books. .
 Griffith, Roger (1969). The Bideford, Westward Ho! and Appledore Railway. School project and personal communications. Bideford Museum.
 Jenkins, Stanley C. (1993). The Bideford, Westward Ho! and Appledore Railway. Oxford : Oakwood Press. .
 Stuckey, Douglas (1962). The Bideford, Westward Ho! and Appledore Railway 1901-1917. Pub. West Country Publications.

Disused railway stations in Devon
Former Bideford, Westward Ho! and Appledore Railway stations
Railway stations in Great Britain opened in 1901
Railway stations in Great Britain closed in 1917
Torridge District